Absolom is both a surname and a given name. Notable people with the name include:

Charlie Absolom (1846–1889), English cricketer
Joe Absolom (born 1978), English actor
Ted Absolom (1875–1927), Australian rules footballer
Absolom Gant (1832–1897), American politician from Texas
Absolom M. West (1818–1894), American militia general and politician
Absolom of Caesarea, one of the Martyrs of Caesarea (also known as Absalom, Absalon, and Absolucius)

See also
Absolom (disambiguation)